James Ellison (born James Ellison Smith; May 4, 1910 – December 23, 1993) was an American film actor who appeared in nearly 70 films from 1932 to 1962.

Biography
Ellison was born in Guthrie Center, Iowa, the son of Edward James Smith and Ona Mary Ellis. He worked for a time in a film laboratory and while there was offered a screen test. He developed the film footage himself, and after he saw it, decided it was not satisfactory so he would not show it to the director. But the director saw it anyway and Ellison got a contract.

He spent much of his career in westerns, including a stint in the mid-1930s as Johnny Nelson, the sidekick of Hopalong Cassidy in Paramount's highly successful series. Although he was a "supporting player" in the series, his name is oddly billed the same size and format as veteran actor and matinee idol William Boyd's. Though it is not confirmed, this is believed to be because the character Johnny Nelson is very prominent in the original Hopalong Cassidy book series.

In 1936, he played his highest-profile role as Buffalo Bill in Cecil B. DeMille's The Plainsman, which also starred Gary Cooper and Jean Arthur. Although this film was a success, DeMille reportedly hated Ellison's performance and wanted to be certain the young actor never appeared in a film of equal quality again.

In 1938, he played the role of Keith Morgan in the romantic comedy Vivacious Lady, receiving third billing to Ginger Rogers and Jimmy Stewart.

The same year, he played a charming, romantic character opposite Lucille Ball in the RKO Pictures comedy Next Time I Marry. He later shared top billing with Ball in 1940's You Can't Fool Your Wife.

Ellison spent most of the remainder of his career shuttling between cowboy pictures and more varied roles, primarily in B movies like Mr. District Attorney in the Carter Case and The Undying Monster. He had a supporting role in 1941's Charley's Aunt (which starred Jack Benny) and played the romantic lead in 1943's The Gang's All Here, a Twentieth Century Fox musical in which he seemed somewhat lost among the vivid antics of Carmen Miranda, Charlotte Greenwood, and Edward Everett Horton (and was the only principal not to sing a note). He also co-starred with Tom Conway and Frances Dee in Val Lewton's production of I Walked with a Zombie, directed by Jacques Tourneur.

Ellison landed another romantic lead role as Jerry Gibson in the musical film Lady, Let's Dance (1944) which starred ice-skating sensation Belita. In 1950, Ellison landed the leading role in a series of B-western movies for Lippert Pictures, where he was billed as "Shamrock" Ellison.

In the early 1950s, Ellison moved from acting to real estate. Joining fellow veteran Jackie Coogan, Ellison returned to the screen to play Axel 'Longhorn' Gates in a picture called When the Girls Take Over (1962).

Death
James Ellison died at age 83 in Monterey, California  after suffering a broken neck as the result of a fall. He is interred at Forest Lawn Memorial Park in the Hollywood Hills of Los Angeles.

Selected filmography

 Play Girl (1932) - Elmer
 The Famous Ferguson Case (1932) - Lane--Reporter (uncredited)
 Central Airport (1933) - Amarillo Pilot Crossing Fingers (uncredited)
 Eight Girls in a Boat (1934) - Romantic Boy (uncredited)
 Carolina (1934) - Dancer (uncredited)
 Death on the Diamond (1934) - Cubs Player (uncredited)
 Student Tour (1934) - Student (uncredited)
 Buried Loot (1935, Short) - Bob - Detective (uncredited)
 The Winning Ticket (1935) - Jimmy Powers
 After Office Hours (1935) - Harvey (uncredited)
 Reckless (1935) - Dale Every
 Hop-Along Cassidy (1935) - Johnny Nelson
 The Eagle's Brood (1935) - Johnny Nelson
 Bar 20 Rides Again (1935) - Johnny Nelson
 Hitch Hike Lady (1935) - Jimmy Peyton
 The Leathernecks Have Landed (1936) - Mac MacDonald
 Heart of the West (1936) - Johnny Nelson
 Call of the Prairie (1936) - Johnny Nelson
 Three on the Trail (1936) - Johnny Nelson
 The Plainsman (1936) - Buffalo Bill Cody
 Trail Dust (1936) - Johnny Nelson
 Borderland (1937) - Johnny Nelson
 23 1/2 Hours' Leave (1937) - Sgt. Robert Gray
 The Barrier (1937) - Lieutenant Burrell
 Annapolis Salute (1937) - Bill Martin
 Vivacious Lady (1938) - Keith Morgan
 Mother Carey's Chickens (1938) - Ralph Thurston
 Next Time I Marry (1938) - Anthony J. Anthony
 Almost a Gentleman (1939) - Dan Preston
 Zenobia (1939) - Jeff Carter
 Sorority House (1939) - Bill Loomis
 Hotel for Women (1939) - Jeff Buchanan
 5th Ave Girl (1939) - Mike
 You Can't Fool Your Wife (1940) - Andrew 'Hinkie' Hinklin
 Anne of Windy Poplars (1940) - Tony Pringle
 Play Girl (1941) - Thomas Elwood Dice
 They Met in Argentina (1941) - Tim Kelly
 Charley's Aunt (1941) - Jack Chesney
 Ice-Capades (1941) - Bob Clemens
 Mr. District Attorney in the Carter Case (1941) - P. Cadwallader Jones
 Careful, Soft Shoulder (1942) - Thomas Aldrich
 Army Surgeon (1942) - Capt. James 'Jim' Mason
 That Other Woman (1942) - Henry Summers
 The Undying Monster (1942) - Robert Curtis
 Dixie Dugan (1943) - Roger Hudson
 I Walked with a Zombie (1943) - Wesley Rand
 Best Foot Forward (1943) - Cadet (uncredited)
 The Gang's All Here (1943) - Andy Mason
 Lady, Let's Dance (1944) - Jerry Gibson
 Johnny Doesn't Live Here Anymore (1944) - Mike O'Brien
 Hollywood and Vine (1945) - Larry Winters
 G.I. War Brides (1946) - Steve Giles
 Calendar Girl (1947) - Steve Adams
 The Ghost Goes Wild (1947) - Monte Crandall
 Last of the Wild Horses (1948) - Duke Barnum
 Hostile Country (1950) - Shamrock Ellison
 Everybody's Dancin' (1950) - Jimmy Ellison
 Marshal of Heldorado (1950) - James Shamrock Ellison
 Crooked River (1950) - Shamrock Ellison
 Colorado Ranger (1950) - Shamrock Kid
 West of the Brazos (1950) - James Everett Parkington 'Shamrock' Ellison
 Fast on the Draw (1950) - Shamrock Ellison
 I Killed Geronimo (1950) - Capt. Jeff Packard
 The Texan Meets Calamity Jane (1950) - Gordon Hastings
 Kentucky Jubilee (1951) - Jeff Benson
 Oklahoma Justice (1951) - Clancy
 Whistling Hills (1951) - Sheriff Dave Holland
 Texas Lawmen (1951) - Sheriff Tod Merrick
 Texas City (1952) - Jim Kirby
 Man from the Black Hills (1952) - Jim Fallon
 Dead Man's Trail (1952) - Dan Winslow
 When the Girls Take Over (1962) - Axel 'Longhorn' Gates (final film role, shot in 1960)

References

External links

1910 births
1993 deaths
Male actors from Iowa
American male film actors
20th-century American male actors
People from Guthrie Center, Iowa
Accidental deaths from falls
Accidental deaths in California

id:James Ellison